Lorenzo Avagnina (born November 14, 1980)  is an Italian professional baseball outfielder, for San Marino Baseball Club in the Italian Baseball League.

He played for Montepaschi Grosseto and Rimini Baseball Club before joining San Marino in 2011.

He also played for the Italy national baseball team in the 2006 Intercontinental Cup, 2007 European Baseball Championship, 2007 Baseball World Cup, 2008 European Cup, 2010 European Cup, 2010 European Baseball Championship, 2011 Baseball World Cup, 2012 European Baseball Championship and 2013 World Baseball Classic.

References

External links

1980 births
Baseball outfielders
Living people
2013 World Baseball Classic players
People from Fossano
Italian baseball players
Sportspeople from the Province of Cuneo